Thalassina anomala, known as the scorpion mud lobster, is a species of crustacean in the family Thalassinidae.

Description 
Its body is yellow to reddish-brown.

Distribution 
T. anomala is found in the Indo-West Pacific region. It is the most common decapod crustacean in the Sundarbans in India and Bangladesh, though it is often overlooked in traditional sampling efforts.

Ecology and behavior 
Its habitat includes littoral and supralittoral zones such as those in mangroves and estuaries. In the monsoon season, its muddy nest becomes saturated with water and submerges, and the lobster is exposed, allowing it to be easily caught.

T. anomala is considered of high importance ecologically, as its nightly burrowing pushes deep soil to the surface, while also helping the import of aerated tidal water up to 2.5 meters deep. The mud mounds provide habitat for other animals including Odontomachus malignus (an ant), termites, Episesarma singaporense (tree-climbing crab), Wolffogebia phuketensis (mangrove mud shrimp), Acrochordus granulatus (file snake), and plants such as the tree Excoecaria agallochoa and ferns.

References

Thalassinidea
Edible crustaceans
Extant Albian first appearances
Crustaceans described in 1804